Eupithecia semilotaria is a moth in the family Geometridae. It is found in southern Chile.

The length of the forewings is about 10.5 mm for males. The forewings are whitish with slender reddish brown wavy lines and blackish brown scaling along the costa near the base. The hindwings are greyish white with an increasing number of pale grey scales distally, contrasting in color with the forewings. Adults have been recorded on wing in March.

References

Moths described in 1885
semilotaria
Moths of South America
Endemic fauna of Chile